Ron Friedman may refer to:

 Ron Friedman (producer) (born 1932), American television and film producer and writer
 Ron Friedman (author) (born 1977), psychologist and behavior change expert
 Ron J. Friedman, American screenwriter